John Melo is a Filipino singer and songwriter. He won the 1993 Awit Awards for Best New Male Performance. After a long absence from the music scene, he returned in 2017 with his new song Malapit Na Ang Pasko. He is also a U.S Correspondent and a sports news writer

Biography 
Dr. Ponciano Melo Jr. DDS is known in the Philippines under his stage name of John Melo. He is the singer of Malapit Na Ang Pasko which is the first Filipino song to be recorded in San Francisco, Golden Bridge U.S. for a Christmas theme. He is recently named as OFW Prince of Christmas Song due to dedicating a Christmas song for all OFWs around the world. Multi Awarded Songwriter Jimmy Borja composed this song for Melo.
John Melo is a consultant in California and a member of the American Dental Association.

Early life 
John Melo inherited his love for music from his mother Leticia Cortes, who took up Bachelor of Music Major in Piano in the University of Sto. Tomas.

His admiration for the singer later led him on to revive two Castelo songs for his “Magtiwala Ka” album namely “Ibig Kong Ibigin Ka” and “Nang Dahil Sa Pag-ibig”.

He has also tributed many songs for others such as Manny Pacquiao, with the song "Laban Mo, Laban Ko."

Malapit Na Ang Pasko and Christmas Tree is Blue 
"Malapit Na Ang Pasko" and "Christmas Tree is Blue" are John Melo's newest Christmas songs dedicated to all OFWs as sense of gratitude being an OFW himself. Currently hands-on with his dental business offices in San Jose and Newark, California, Melo managed to render songs for OFWs even if preoccupied with his passion in business.

John Melo expressed that his life as an OFW away from his loved ones in the Philippines is encapsulated in the song Malapit Na Ang Pasko being in California for more than a decade.

While there are plans that his English Christmas song "Christmas Tree is Blue" will be released in 2018.

U.S. International Correspondent and Sports News Writer 
John Melo pursued a sports news writing career under Manila Standard and international correspondent of Bombo Radyo Philippines. Some of his articles  are covering NBA, Manny Pacquiao and other sports news. Boxing  and NBA news are his biggest contribution to Filipinos worldwide.

Awards and Distinctions

Awit Awards 
1993 John Melo won the title as Best New Male Recording Artist in the 1993 Awit Awards  with "Hanap Hanap Kita". He bested other up-and-coming names in the music scene for the plum such as Chad Borja, Willie Garte and Calvin Millado.

Gold Record Award 
On 1992 John Melo received his Gold Record Award. His debut album "Ikaw Pala Ang Minamahal" was composed by Vehnee Saturno and arranged by Homer Flores.

Ikaw Pala Ang Minamahal Album with carrier single Hanap-hanap Kita includes

 Ang Mahalaga
 Hanap-hanap kita
 Ikaw Pala Ang Minamahal
 Kung Mayroong Ikaw
 Kursunada Kita
 Nais Kung Malaman Mo
 Nakita Ko Na
 Sanay Laging Kapiling Ka

See also 
 Jose Mari Chan
 Haiji Alejandro

References 

 
 Awit Awards Winners

External links

Year of birth missing (living people)
Living people
20th-century Filipino male singers
Filipino singer-songwriters
21st-century Filipino male singers